dig is a network administration command-line tool for querying the Domain Name System (DNS).

dig (Domain Information Groper) is useful for network troubleshooting and for educational purposes. It can operate based on command line option and flag arguments, or in batch mode by reading requests from an operating system file. When a specific name server is not specified in the command invocation, it uses the operating system's default resolver, usually configured in the file resolv.conf. Without any arguments it queries the DNS root zone.

dig supports Internationalized domain name (IDN) queries.

dig is a component of the domain name server software suite BIND. dig supersedes in functionality older tools, such as nslookup and the program host; however, the older tools are still used in complementary fashion.

Example usage

Basic 
In this example, dig is used to query for any type of record information in the domain example.com:

$ dig example.com any
; <<>> DiG 9.6.1 <<>> example.com any
;; global options: +cmd
;; Got answer:
;; ->>HEADER<<- opcode: QUERY, status: NOERROR, id: 4016
;; flags: qr rd ra; QUERY: 1, ANSWER: 4, AUTHORITY: 0, ADDITIONAL: 0

;; QUESTION SECTION:
;example.com.                   IN      ANY

;; ANSWER SECTION:
example.com.            172719  IN      NS      a.iana-servers.net.
example.com.            172719  IN      NS      b.iana-servers.net.
example.com.            172719  IN      A       208.77.188.166
example.com.            172719  IN      SOA     dns1.icann.org. hostmaster.icann.org. 2007051703 7200 3600 1209600 86400

;; Query time: 1 msec
;; SERVER: ::1#53(::1)
;; WHEN: Wed Aug 12 11:40:43 2009
;; MSG SIZE  rcvd: 154

The number 172719 in the above example is the time to live value, which indicates the time of validity of the data.

The any DNS query is a special meta query which is now deprecated. Since around 2019, most public DNS servers have stopped answering most DNS ANY queries usefully .

If ANY queries do not enumerate multiple records, the only option is to request each record type (e.g. A, CNAME, or MX) individually.

Specific DNS server 
Queries may be directed to designated DNS servers for specific records; in this example, MX records:
$ dig wikimedia.org MX @ns0.wikimedia.org
; <<>> DiG 9.11.3 <<>> wikimedia.org MX @ns0.wikimedia.org
;; global options: +cmd
;; Got answer:
;; ->>HEADER<<- opcode: QUERY, status: NOERROR, id: 39041
;; flags: qr aa rd; QUERY: 1, ANSWER: 2, AUTHORITY: 0, ADDITIONAL: 1
;; WARNING: recursion requested but not available

;; OPT PSEUDOSECTION:
; EDNS: version: 0, flags:; udp: 1024
; COOKIE: c9735311d2d2fa6e3b334ab01b67960d (good)
;; QUESTION SECTION:
;wikimedia.org.                 IN      MX

;; ANSWER SECTION:
wikimedia.org.          3600    IN      MX      10 mx1001.wikimedia.org.
wikimedia.org.          3600    IN      MX      50 mx2001.wikimedia.org.

;; Query time: 1 msec
;; SERVER: 208.80.154.238#53(208.80.154.238)
;; WHEN: Sat Sep 18 21:33:24 PDT 2021
;; MSG SIZE  rcvd: 108

With output formatting 
There are many output formatting options available. A common selection to make the output more terse is:

$ dig +noall +answer +multiline wikimedia.org MX
wikimedia.org.          3600 IN MX 10 mx1001.wikimedia.org.
wikimedia.org.          3600 IN MX 50 mx2001.wikimedia.org.

Where +noall +answer +multiline are simply output formatting flags.

History
dig was originally written by Steve Hotz and incorporated into BIND 4; later it was rewritten by Michael Sawyer, and is maintained by the Internet Systems Consortium as part of BIND 9.

When originally written, the manual page for dig indicated that its name was an acronym for "Domain Information Groper". This expansion was removed in 2017; the tool's name is now simply "dig".

See also
 BIND name server
 Root name server – top-level name servers providing top level domain name resolution
 List of DNS record types – possible types of records stored and queried within DNS
 whois
 host is a simple utility for performing Domain Name System lookups
 nslookup, another utility that can be used to obtain similar information

References

Bibliography
 Paul Albitz and Cricket Liu. DNS and BIND, 5th Edition. Nutshell Series. O'Reilly and Associates, Inc., 2006.

External links
Official BIND 9 man page for dig
How to use dig to query DNS name servers
Dig source code in ISC Gitlab repository

DNS software
Domain Name System
Free network-related software